William George Reginald Hobbs (16 May 1927 – 29 September 2012) was an Alderney-born Canadian artist.

Early life
His family moved around considerably due to his father's career in the British Army. The family eventually settled in his fathers home town of Plymouth in the county of Devon. During the Second World War, William along with his three brothers Frederick, John and Dennis were evacuated from blitz-torn Plymouth to Penzance. Just after Victory in Europe, but still during World War II, William did his military service and received a scholarship to study medicine. He went to Bristol University where he also realized and developed a talent for art. His sketches and paintings were admired by art teachers at the University who advised him to study art rather than medicine. Nonetheless, William Hobbs graduated from Bristol with a degree as a general practitioner in medicine. He then joined the Royal Navy in the tradition of his family and became a ship's surgeon in 1950.

Emigration

William Hobbs emigrated to Canada in 1959. In Canada he began a career as a physician and surgeon in the village Gainsborough, Saskatchewan and became a respected physician in the southeast Saskatchewan and southwestern Manitoba area. Notwithstanding the considerable demands in time alone imposed upon him by his role in this rural community, he managed to develop a technical skill in painting which won him first prize in a major Canadian art show in 1978. William Hobbs also attended courses at the Pan American University, Banff School of Fine Arts, and the Emma Lake Campus at the University of Saskatchewan.

Artist
He took the first place at the Fifth Texas International Art Show in 1976 and second place at the seventh in 1978. He has been honoured with a number of one-man shows, as well as having his work selected for showing at the International Grand Prix of contemporary Art in Monte Carlo. His work was on exhibit at the winter garden pavilion in December 1978, under the high patronage of the Sovereign Prince and Princess of Monaco.
Much of Hobbs's work reflects the influence his immigration had on him, as is portrayed in a series consisting of six major works on that subject.
His work is in many North American and European collections and also in those of Mitsubishi Ltd., Marubeni Ltd. and Tohoku Electric Power of Japan, and other collections internationally.

He served as Mayor of Gainsborough, Saskatchewan in the 1970s. During his term as Mayor, he was instrumental in having a swimming pool built.

Where's Rembrandt
There's a little Rembrandt in paintings by William Hobbs, and fans and spectators always look for in his work. Rembrandt is the nickname of the little Jack Russell Terrier that often appears in Williams railway paintings. It's a nod to the master Rembrandt, who placed a similar dog, darkly lit, in his most famous painting, The Night Watch. But in Hobbs's paintings, the dog doesn't scurry around musketeers in plumed hats and sashed waists but around old steam engine trains and train stations.

Personal life
Hobbs was the second eldest of four brothers. The third eldest was John Raymond Hobbs (1929–2008), a professor of chemical immunology.

William Hobbs died in September 2012 at the age of 85.

References

External links
painting, Moonlight Express
canada artist
Saskatchewan Legislature

1927 births
2012 deaths
20th-century British painters
20th-century Canadian painters
Canadian male painters
21st-century British painters
21st-century Canadian painters
British male painters
English people of German descent
Landscape artists
University of Saskatchewan alumni
Artists from Manitoba
People from Brandon, Manitoba
20th-century British male artists
21st-century British male artists
20th-century Canadian male artists
21st-century Canadian male artists